The Crazy World Tour was a concert tour by German rock band Scorpions, which started on 6 June 2017 in Montbéliard, France, and concluded on 4 March 2020 in Kallang, Singapore. It is not to be confused with the similarly titled 1990–1991 tour in support of the band's eleventh studio album Crazy World.

Background
On 22 March 2017, Scorpions officially announced the "Crazy World Tour" and the North American dates. They also announced Megadeth as their opening act for that leg. With this tour, the band is continuing to celebrate their more than 50 years in the music business. Commenting on the tour, Klaus Meine stated: "When our album Crazy World was released back in '91, right at the end of the Cold War, we toured around a world that was pretty crazy back then, but there was so much hope in the air for a more peaceful future. Now 26 years later, things are getting more crazy every other day. After all these years, 'Crazy World' is still a good motto for our upcoming world tour. We are very much looking forward to seeing all of you out there". On 7 October 2017, it was announced that concerts on 8 October in Phoenix, Arizona, on 11 October in San Antonio, Texas, 12 October in Dallas, Texas, 14 October in Fort Lauderdale, Florida, and on 15 October 2017 in Tampa, Florida would be cancelled due to Klaus Meine's severe laryngitis. Meine had been advised by otorhinolaryngologist in Los Angeles to rest his voice, because he could risk permanent vocal damage. On 7 November 2017, the band announced concerts for the spring of 2018 in France and the Netherlands.

Critical Reception
John J. Moser from The Morning Call for the concert in Santander Arena in Reading, Pennsylvania said that "In a 95-minute set of 12 songs that kicked off Scorpions' latest U.S. tour, the group was not perfect. At 69, singer Klaus Meine's voice still is amazing, but has started to show a tattered edge here and there. Also as 69, guitarist Rudolf Schenker carried few of the leads – though he was solid when he did and was impressively energetic. But what really carried the night was Scorpions' screaming yet melodic rock – its guitar attack like no other band." Joe Divita from Loudwire said that performance in Madison Square Garden was "just as driving and anthemic as any of their biggest hits". He also added that "they visibly have a blast onstage and when you're having this much fun, how could you stop? Why would you want to? One day, the band will inevitably call it a day for good, but until then, we'll turn up each time, cherishing the opportunity as the number of artists from this era dwindle".

Chris Bubinas from Exclaim! said about the concert in Place Bell in Laval that "Vocalist Klaus Meine, seeming immune to the hands of time, provided vocals that were absolutely flawless as he patrolled and poured himself into the crowd". Bob Gendron from Chicago Tribune said about the concert in Allstate Arena in Chicago that "Akin to many of the fans who sang along to nearly every word and occasionally filled in for Meine, the German quintet continues to cling to the straightforward identity it's projected for most of its 52-year career". Kari Kenner from Daily Herrald commented about the concert in Salt Lake City that "Anyone who saw the German rockers on their previous two visits to USANA Amphitheatre in 2010 and 2012 as part of an announced farewell tour had to have an inkling — or at least an intense hope — that retirement wouldn't stick. The band simply had too much left in the tank from a live standpoint to think about exchanging their leather pants and jackets for stay-at-home loungewear". Azaria Podplesky from The Spokesman-Review about concert in Spokane Arena said "Judging by the smiles on the face of each musician as they waved goodbye and tossed picks and drumsticks into the crowd, it's safe to say Scorpions enjoyed the trip down memory lane as much as fans did".

Setlists

Tour dates

Cancelled shows

Personnel

Klaus Meine – lead vocals
Rudolf Schenker – rhythm guitar, backing vocals
Matthias Jabs – lead guitar, backing vocals
Paweł Mąciwoda – bass, backing vocals
Mikkey Dee – drums, percussion

References

2017 concert tours
2018 concert tours
2019 concert tours
2020 concert tours
Scorpions (band) concert tours